San Pietro in Cariano is a comune (municipality) in the Province of Verona in the Italian region Veneto, located about  west of Venice and about  northwest of Verona. It is located in the geographical region of Valpolicella.

The main attraction is the Romanesque pieve of San Floriano (10th century) and Villa Serego, a Palladian villa designed by Andrea Palladio.

Twin towns
San Pietro in Cariano is twinned with:
 Ingelheim am Rhein, Germany
 Ludlow, England, United Kingdom
 Stans, Austria

References

External links

 Official website

Cities and towns in Veneto